Dyakia salangana is a species of air-breathing land snail, a terrestrial pulmonate gastropod mollusk in the family Dyakiidae.

The shell of this species is sinistral (left-handed) in coiling.

References

 Listing of paper on the species

Dyakiidae
Gastropods described in 1883